"Sweetness" is Misia's 5th single. It was released on November 25, 1999 simultaneously with Wasurenai Hibi. It peaked at #7 selling 92,290 copies on its first week and went on to sell over 200,000 copies

The song's melody is similar to After 7's "Ready or Not".

Track list

Charts

External links
https://web.archive.org/web/20061117164950/http://www.rhythmedia.co.jp/misia/disc/ — Misia discography

1999 songs
Misia songs
Songs written by Misia
1999 singles